Louis Paul Lebreton (October 19, 1875 in Paris – March 31, 1960 in Paris) was a French tennis player. He was born Bordeaux and died in Lyon. He was three-time a runner-up in the singles event of the Amateur French Championships, losing in 1898 and 1899 to Paul Aymé, and in 1901 to André Vacherot. 

He also competed in the men's singles and doubles events at the 1900 Summer Olympics.

Grand Slam finals

Singles: 3 (0-3)

References

External links
 

19th-century male tennis players
French Championships (tennis) champions
French male tennis players
Olympic tennis players of France
Tennis players at the 1900 Summer Olympics
Tennis players from Paris
1875 births
1960 deaths